Alberto Augusto Crespo (16 January 1920 – 14 August 1991) was a racing driver from Buenos Aires, Argentina. He entered one World Championship Formula One Grand Prix, the 1952 Italian Grand Prix, with a Maserati entered for him by Enrico Platé. Crespo narrowly failed to qualify.

Complete Formula One World Championship results
(key) 

1920 births
1991 deaths
Racing drivers from Buenos Aires
Argentine racing drivers
Argentine Formula One drivers
Enrico Platé Formula One drivers
World Sportscar Championship drivers

Carrera Panamericana drivers